Madhumitha (born Swapna Madhuri on 20 August 1981) is an Indian actress who appears in Telugu and Tamil films.

Career
Madhumitha started her acting career under her birth name Swapna Madhuri with the 2002 Telugu film Sandade Sandadi (2002) doing a pivotal supporting role. She continued playing supporting roles in a couple of Telugu films like Manmadhudu (2002) along with Nagarjuna and Sonali Bendre, Ammailu Abbailu (2003) and Puttintiki Ra Chelli (2004) sharing screen space with Arjun and Meena, with the latter in particular becoming a high commercial success, running for 275 days in theatres. She then got introduced to the Tamil film industry by R. Parthiban in his film Kudaikul Mazhai (2004), enacting the lead female role and changing her screen name to Madhumitha, named after her character in the film.

Though the film wasn't a major success, Madhumitha received several offers from Tamil directors. She played leading roles in several Tamil films like Amudhae (2005), Englishkaran (2005) opposite Sathyaraj and Namitha. She was appreciated for her performance in Englishkaran. Review by India glitz.com quoted, "Madhumitha dominates the film. After her debut venture Kudaikul Mazhai, she has got a good scope to act, and she has used the opportunity well". Her next release was, Naalai (2006), which, however, did not fetch her any recognition, despite being moderate successes. She then appeared in the 2007 Tamil independent film Aanivaer, a film about the Sri Lankan Civil War, in which she enacted the role of a journalist. Since the film was released in many Western Tamil diasporal regions, she became widely noticed by the Tamil audience, winning accolades for her performance. In 2008, she appeared in the Tamil comedy film Arai En 305-il Kadavul, directed by Simbudevan, acting along with comedy actors Santhanam and Ganja Karuppu. She was next seen in Yogi, opposite director-turned-actor Ameer Sultan, Madhumitha's role was unanimously praised with a reviewer from Rediff.com citing that "Madhumitha, taking on a role even experienced actresses might balk at and coming out trumps" Her performance as a young mother living in the Chennai slums, was critically praised, winning her a nomination for the Best Supporting Actress Award at the 3rd Vijay Awards. Solla Solla Inikkum, got released post marriage, which failed to achieve commercial success. Post her marriage, she played supporting roles in Venkat Prabhu's Biriyani and the Telugu films Uu Kodathara? Ulikki Padathara?, Maine Pyar Kiya and Bhale Bhale Magadivoy.

Personal life
Madhumitha married her longtime boyfriend, actor Siva Balaji on 1 March 2009 at Kalinga Function Place in Hyderabad, Telangana. Siva Balaji was her co-actor in her film Englishkaran. They have two sons, Dhanvin kangula and Gagan kangula.

Filmography

References

External links
 

Living people
Actresses from Hyderabad, India
Actresses in Telugu cinema
Actresses in Tamil cinema
Actresses in Malayalam cinema
Actresses in Kannada cinema
Indian film actresses
1983 births
21st-century Indian actresses